Strazde Parish is an administrative unit of Talsi Municipality, Latvia.

Towns, villages and settlements of Strazde parish 
  - parish administrative center

References 

Parishes of Latvia
Talsi Municipality